The 2009–10 Polish Cup was the fifty-sixth season of the annual Polish cup competition. It began on July 29, 2009 with the extra preliminary round and ended on May 21, 2010 with the final, played at neutral venue. The winners qualified for the third qualifying round of the UEFA Europa League. Lech Poznań were the defending champions.

Extra preliminary round

The matches were played on 29 July 2009.

! colspan="3" style="background:cornsilk;"|29 July 2009

|}

Preliminary round
Nielba Wągrowiec and Hetman Zamość were automatically drawn to the first round.

The matches were played on 11 August 2009.

! colspan="3" style="background:cornsilk;"|11 August 2009

|-
! colspan="3" style="background:cornsilk;"|12 August 2009

|}

Round 1
The twelve winners of the preliminary round, along with Nielba Wągrowiec and Hetman Zamość and the eighteen teams from 2008–09 I Liga competed in this round.
Okocimski KS Brzesko was drawn automatically to the second round.

The matches were played on 25 and 26 August 2009.

|-
! colspan="3" style="background:cornsilk;"|25 August 2009

|-
! colspan="3" style="background:cornsilk;"|26 August 2009

|}

Round 2
The fifteen winners of Round 1, along with Okocimski KS Brzesko and the sixteen teams from 2008–09 Ekstraklasa, competed in this round.

The matches were played on 23 & 29 September and 7 October 2009.

! colspan="3" style="background:cornsilk;"|23 September 2009

|-
! colspan="3" style="background:cornsilk;"|29 September 2009

|-
! colspan="3" style="background:cornsilk;"|7 October 2009

|}

Round 3
The sixteen winners of Round 2 competed in this round.

The matches were played on 27, 28 October 2009 and on 3, 11, 25 November 2009.

|-
! colspan="3" style="background:cornsilk;"|27 October 2009

|-
! colspan="3" style="background:cornsilk;"|28 October 2009

|-
! colspan="3" style="background:cornsilk;"|3 November 2009

|-
! colspan="3" style="background:cornsilk;"|11 November 2009

|-
! colspan="3" style="background:cornsilk;"|25 November 2009

|}

Quarter-finals
The eight winners of Round 3 competed in this round.

The Quarterfinals were played in two legs. The first legs were played on 16 & 17 March 2010, while the second legs took place one week later on 23 & 24 March 2010.

|}

First leg

Second leg

Semi-finals
The four teams that advanced from the Quarterfinals, competed in this round. The two winners advanced to the last round, the finals.

The first leg of the Semi-finals were played on April 6, while the second legs took place on May 4, 2010.

|}

First leg

Second leg

Final

Top goalscorers
Source: 90minut.pl
4 goals
  Piotr Dziuba (Pogoń Szczecin)
  Tomasz Kempiński (Piast Kobylin)
  Tomasz Frankowski (Jagiellonia Białystok)

3 goals
  Paweł Buzała (Lechia Gdańsk)
  Wojciech Fabianowski (Sandecja Nowy Sącz)
  Michał Filipowicz (Zagłębie Sosnowiec)
  Hubert Jaromin (Zagłębie Sosnowiec)
  Mikołaj Lebedyński (Pogoń Szczecin)
  Iwan Łytwyniuk (Hetman Zamość)
  Patryk Małecki (Wisła Kraków)
  Ousmane Sylla (Polonia Słubice)
  Mateusz Wróbel (GKS Tychy)

See also
 2009–10 Ekstraklasa

References

2009
2009–10 domestic association football cups
Cup